Monyoród is a village and municipality in Baranya County, Hungary.
Until the end of World War II, the majority of the inhabitants were Danube Swabians, also called locally as Stifolder, because their ancestors once came at the 17th century and 18th century from Fulda (district). Mostly of the former German settlers were expelled to allied-occupied Germany and allied-occupied Austria in 1945–1948, as a result of the Potsdam Agreement.
Only a few Germans of Hungary live there, the majority today are the descendants of Hungarians from the Czechoslovak–Hungarian population exchange. They occupied the houses of the former Danube Swabians inhabitants.

Geography 
Monyoród is located in east central Baranya County, about halfway between Pécs and Mohács, and 10 kilometers north of Bóly. The municipality lies within the Southern Transdanubia Region of Hungary. It previously was part of the Mohács Subregion but during the creation of districts in 2013, it became part of Bóly District.

Demographics 
During the census of 2011, the population was 163. The majority of the population claimed Hungarian ethnicity (64.9%). Other ethnicities claimed included German (14.9%), Croatian (8.4%), Roma (1.3%) and Romanian (1.3%). 33.1% did not wish to answer. In terms of religious practice, 45.5% reported to be Roman Catholic, 7.1% Calvinist, 8.4% of no religious affiliation and 39% did not wish to answer.

Transport 
The closest railway station is in Bóly, 10 kilometers to the south.

References

Populated places in Baranya County